Lower Wield is a village in the East Hampshire district of Hampshire, England. It is in the civil parish of Wield.

At one time, Lower Wield came under the large parish of Bentworth until its decline in the mid-19th century. Although today, Wield's parish borders the parish of Bentworth.

The village has one public house, The Yew Tree.

References

External links

 Hampshire Treasures Volume 6 (East Hampshire) Pages 321, 323, 324, 325, and 326

Villages in Hampshire